In telecommunications, directory assistance or directory inquiries is a phone service used to find out a specific telephone number and/or address of a residence, business, or government entity.

Technology
Directory assistance systems incorporate a wide range of automation to reduce the cost of human operators. Almost all systems use custom database software to locate listings quickly.

Most directory assistance systems use automated readback systems to give out the phone number. This frees the directory assistance operator to move on to another caller as soon as the correct listing is located.

Some systems have "store and forward" technology which records "city and state" the caller is requesting and then plays the city and state speech to the operator before they come online and then say "Residential or business listing?" or simply "What listing please?"

Interactive voice response systems have been added to many directory assistance systems. These complex systems use speech recognition and recorded speech or speech synthesis to handle the entire call without live operator intervention.

Most systems recognize location and listing. If recognition confidence is high, the best result is played to the caller. If confidence is low, the caller's request is played back to a live operator, who locates the correct listing.

North America
In the North American Numbering Plan (covering Canada, the United States, and parts of the Caribbean), directory assistance may be contacted by dialing 4-1-1 (one of the N11 codes).  To get a listing in a remote or non-local area code, directory assistance is available at 1-area code-555-1212.  In some cases, a 411 call from a landline will yield local, national, and sometimes international listings.

Most telephone companies permit up to two listings per 411 calls. All wireless carriers offer nationwide listings with 411, and some offer additional Enhanced Directory Assistance services. However, wireless numbers for residential customers are not available via 411.

Billing
Historically, the tariffs for wireline telephone service allowed subscribers to place a certain number of directory assistance calls for free each month.  More recently, telephone companies are charging subscribers for every directory assistance call.

U.S. wireline telephone companies classify DA into four rate classes:

 411 LDA: Local Directory Assistance. 411 is dialed, and the operator is requested to search for a listing in a group of area codes local to the caller (LATA). Example: the caller lives in area code 630 (Oak Brook, IL) and requests a listing for a business in area code 312 (Chicago, IL). In this case, AT&T Illinois bills the call.
 411 NDA: National Directory Assistance. 411 is dialed and the operator is requested to search for a listing in an area code not local to the caller. For example: The caller lives in area code 630 (Oak Brook, IL) and requests a listing for a business in area code 213 (Los Angeles, CA). In this case, AT&T Illinois bills the call.
 (area code) 555–1212: National Directory Assistance. This example assumes the caller is in Oak Brook, IL (area code 630) and uses Verizon as their long-distance carrier. Example: The caller is looking for a listing in Los Angeles, CA (area code 213) and dials 213-555-1212. In this case, Verizon bills the call.
 00 and ask for the international directory assistance operator. AT&T provides International Directory Assistance calls. See www.consumer.att.com/global/english/country_codes.html for additional information and country and city codes.

Toll-free directory assistance
In the U.S., directory assistance for companies with toll-free "800 numbers" (with area codes 800, 833, 844, 855, 866, 877, and 888) was available from toll-free directory assistance, reachable by dialing 1-800-555-1212, for many decades until it was discontinued in 2020.

Toll-free directory assistance was provided by telecommunication providers, namely AT&T and Verizon, as mandated by the Federal Communications Commission. Companies requested to have their toll-free number listed, and paid the providers each time their phone number was released to a toll-free directory-assistance caller.

In 1999, AT&T applied for permission to discontinue this service, but it remained active until the summer of 2020. an automated disconnection recording now plays when you call the 1-800-555-1212 number.

Directory assistance data sources
The service of 4-1-1 queries is often outsourced to a call centre that specializes in that function. Historically, when a single carrier provided most of the telephony services for a region, the data used to satisfy the search could come exclusively from that carrier's subscriber rolls. Today, when the market is fragmented amongst many carriers, the data must be aggregated by a data aggregator specializing in directory listings. The data aggregator distributes the data to the 4-1-1 services either on a "live" basis, actually servicing each query, or by periodically transferring large swaths of listings to the call center's systems for local searching.

The data aggregator collects the data from the rolls of many telecommunication carriers. Some carriers, such as Vonage, do not send their customer rolls to the aggregator.

Companies specializing in free directory assistance
Private companies have entered the directory assistance market by offering free directory assistance.They are available in most states like Connecticut  and others. Customers often must listen to an advertisement prior to receiving directory services.

Australia
In Australia, there are two standard directory assistance numbers that can be accessed from any phone provider; these are 1223 for national directory assistance and 1225 for international directory assistance. Other directory service numbers are carrier specific and can only be accessed by customers of that particular provider. For example, Sensis on 1234 is a premium operator-assist directory service that only certain Telstra customers are able to access. Other operator-assist directory services do exist, for example, CallConnect on 12456; however, these numbers are not guaranteed to be accessible from all phone providers within Australia.

United Kingdom

In the United Kingdom directory enquires services (sometimes abbreviated as "DQ") are provided by a variety of different companies, with a variety of call charges, each company reached by dialing a six-digit number beginning with 118. These companies supply information from the Operator Services Information System (OSIS), which is run by Directory Solutions, a division of BT Wholesale. OSIS accepts updates from telecoms providers seven days a week, and supplies that information to the inquiry companies six days a week. , there were over 200 providers. 118 118 (The Number) was the second most-expensive number at £11.23 for a 90-second call, but accounted for 40% of DQ calls, mostly due to heavy advertising.
Until 23 August 2003 directory inquiries were available by dialing 192 for numbers in Britain, and 153 for foreign numbers, with the service supplied by the caller's telephone company. Until the 1990s, the service was free to use; then charges were introduced from 2 April 1991, although for some years directory inquiries continued to be free from payphones. Support for 192 and 153 was replaced on 24 August 2003 by competitive directory inquiries services using different numbers beginning "118".

Calls to DQ services declined by an average of 38% yearly from 2014 to 2017.

Pricing

The pricing structure for UK directory inquiries was reformed by Ofcom on 1 July 2015. Call charges are made up of an access charge by the caller's telephony provider, plus a service charge by the provider of a directory inquiries (or other) service, which is billed for by the phone provider and passed on to the service provider.

The access charge is typically 2p to 13p per minute from landlines, and 5p to 55p per minute from mobiles. It applies for calls to 084, 087, and 09 numbers, and must be shown prominently in tariff lists.

The service charge may be charged per call, per minute, or a combination of the two. The per-call part could range from 5p to £16 and applies as soon as the call is answered. The per-minute part could range from 1p to £8, and may apply from the start of the call, or after the first full minute. There are 100 available service charge price points, known as SC001 to SC100. The service charge must be declared alongside the number wherever it is advertised or promoted.

The applicable service charge codes are also shown in BT's pricing table, section 2, part 15. Having found the "SC" code for a particular number, it is then necessary to refer to part 19 to find the cost.

Following criticism of very high and increasing charges for DQ services, Ofcom introduced a price cap to 2013 levels from 1 April 2019. Charges, including VAT, may not exceed £3.65 per 90 seconds.

Controversies
A number offering a directory inquiries service allowing people to request to be put through to a mobile phone number was established in June 2009. 118 800 proved to be controversial, however, when it was revealed that it was making available 15 million mobile numbers that it had bought from market researchers. Its website was suspended within weeks of its launch so that the company could re-engineer the site to enable the large number of ex-directory requests to be handled more efficiently. The related 118800.co.uk site was discontinued.

In 2014, the 118500 service run by BT was fined £225,000 by PhonepayPlus (later renamed as the Phone-paid Services Authority) for over-charging customers and failing to clearly display call costs. BT was also ordered to refund affected customers.

Later in 2014, a similar failure to clearly state call costs resulted in a fine for the 118118 service.

In 2017, soaring call costs for directory inquiries services, including 118118 and 118500 prompted an Ofcom review of 118 services. A price cap at 2013 rates took effect on 1 April 2019.

Some directory inquiries services stand accused of inappropriate methods of promoting their services, effectively scamming people into calling. Various unallocated geographic and non-geographic numbers play an announcement directing callers to call a particular directory inquiries number for help. People may hear this message when they misdial a wanted number or may appear to have missed a call from the unallocated number and hear this message if they call back.

Charities
Some services donate part of their income to charities, such as animal welfare and football clubs.

Finland 
Teleoperators in Finland are legally obligated to ensure their users' names, addresses, and telephone numbers are collected and published in a telephone directory, and to, for their part, ensure their users have access to a directory inquiry service. Furthermore, teleoperators are obligated to provide this contact information to another company for the purposes of providing a directory inquiry service. In practice, teleoperators hand telephone subscriptions' contact information to Suomen Numeropalvelu Oy, which forms and relays a number database to various directory assistance private companies.

Worldwide
 China
In mainland China, (area code) 114 is dialed for directory assistance in that area code.
 Ethiopia
In Ethiopia, 8123 is dialed for directory assistance.
 Israel
In Israel, 144 or 1344 is dialed for directory assistance. 
 Philippines
In the Philippines, 187 is dialed for PLDT and Digitel subscribers. 
 Taiwan
In Taiwan, directory assistance is available by dialing 105 from mobile phones, or by dialing 104 from landline phones.

 Egypt
In Egypt, directory assistance is available by dialing 140 from mobile phones,and from landline phones.

See also
 555 (telephone number)
 Telephone directory (including Directory assistance on CD)

References

External links
Mark Lawson, The Guardian, 19 March 2005, "Dial 0 for progress"

 
Telecommunication services